The Lithuanian Regions Party (LRP), also translated as the Lithuanian Party of Regions, is a social-democratic political party in Lithuania. It was founded in 2018 as the Social Democratic Labour Party of Lithuania (LSDDP) following a split of members from Social Democratic Party of Lithuania (LSDP; also joined by former members of the Labour Party) following the LSDP's decision to exit a coalition government with the Lithuanian Farmers and Greens Union in 2017.

History

The party was a junior partner in government in the Seimas, Lithuania's unicameral Parliament, from 2018 to 2020. LSDDP has 50 sections.

The party scored badly in the 2019 European Parliament election, scoring only 2.4% of votes and failing to elect any MEP. The party won slightly over 3% of the popular vote and 3 seats in the 2020 parliamentary election (only one MP, Andrius Palionis, was reelected). By this, the party became eligible to state dotation.

In July 2021 the party adopted the name Lithuanian Regions Party, aligning with the new Lithuanian Group of Regions parliamentary group.

Election results

Seimas

European Parliament

Chairmen 
Gediminas Kirkilas – 2018–2021
Jonas Pinskus – from 2021

References 

Political parties established in 2018
2018 establishments in Lithuania
Socialist parties in Lithuania
Social democratic parties